{{Infobox settlement
| official_name          = Padang Pariaman Regency
| native_name            = Kabupaten Padang Pariaman
| native_name_lang       = id
| image_skyline          = 
| image_alt              = 
| image_caption          = 
| type                   = Regency
| image_shield           = Lambang Kabupaten Padang Pariaman.gif
| shield_alt               = 
| motto                  = Saiyo Sakato  (Agree together, one voice together)
| image_map              = Lokasi Sumatra Barat Kabupaten Padang Pariaman.svg
| map_alt                = 
| map_caption            = Location within West Sumatra
| coordinates            = 
| coordinates_footnotes  = 
| subdivision_type       = Country
| subdivision_name       = Indonesia
| subdivision_type1      = Province
| subdivision_name1      = West Sumatra
| seat_type              = Regency seat
| seat                   = Parit Malintang
| leader_title           = Regent
| leader_name            = Ali Mukhni
| area_footnotes         = 
| area_total_km2         = 1343.09
| elevation_min_m        = 
| elevation_max_m        = 
| elevation_m            = 
| population_as_of       = 2020 census
| population_total       = 430626
| population_density_km2 = auto
| population_footnotes   = 
| timezone1              = IWST
| utc_offset1            = +7
| area_code              = (+62) 751
| website                = 
| footnotes              = 
| pushpin_map            = Indonesia_Sumatra#Indonesia
| pushpin_map_caption    = Location in Sumatra and Indonesia
| leader_title1          = Vice Regent
| leader_name1           = Suhatri Bur
| area_code_type         = Area code
}}
Padang Pariaman Regency is a regency (kabupaten) of West Sumatra, Indonesia. It has an area of 1,343.09 km2, and it had a population of 390,204 at the 2010 census and 430,626 at the 2020 census. The regency seat is at the town of Parit Malintang. West Sumatra's capital and biggest city, Padang, is surrounded on the landward side by this regency.

 Administrative districts 
The regency is divided into seventeen districts (kecamatan), tabulated below with their areas and their populations at the 2010 census  and the 2020 census. The table also includes the number of administrative villages (rural desa and urban kelurahan'') in each district.

Geography 
Astronomical position  Padang Pariaman which lies between 0 ° 11 '- 0 ° 49' south latitude and 98 ° 36 '- 100 ° 28' east longitude, with a total area of about 1,343.09 km ² and a coastline length of 60.50 km ². The regency's land area is equivalent to 3.15 percent of the total land area of West Sumatra Province.

Temperatures ranged between 24.4 °C - 25.7 °C, so for the average maximum temperature of 31.08 °C and average minimum temperature of 21.34 °C, with 86.75% relative humidity. Average rainfall for the district overall Pariaman in 2007 amounted to 368.4 mm, with an average days of rain as much as 19 days per month and the average wind speed is 2:14 knots / hour.

West Sumatra Province is a mountainous district nearly 3,000 metres in elevation made of Paleozoic sedimentary rock and Igneous rock that extends from the active row of volcanoes to the east. The Great Sumatran Fault divides the center of the province—the fault topography clearly visible—in a North-northwest to South-southeast direction. The stretch of land between the central mountain range and the shore is made of volcanic uplands and pyroclastic flow uplands with a narrow coastal plain distributed along the seacoast.

Towering above the eastern side (i.e. the mountain side) of Padang Pariaman are two large volcanoes; Gunung Tandikat stands at 2,347m and Gunung Singalang at 2,877m, together forming twin volcanoes. Lake Manijau, located at the north end of Padang Pariaman, is a caldera lake measuring 20 kilometres north–south and 8 kilometres east–west which formed after a large volcanic burst 52,000 years ago. The volcanic products from this giant eruption are scattered over a wide area in the north-central area of Padang Pariaman. Today these volcanic products are seen as pyroclastic flow uplands and low relief hills.

Earthquakes 
Recent earthquakes that occurred along the Great Sumatran Fault that cuts across Sumatra are the series of quakes of 6 March 2007 measuring Mw6.4 and the Mw6.3 earthquake in the vicinity of Singkarak lake, which occurred in eastern Kabupaten Padang Pariaman.

Notes